Stadion Narodowy is an underground station on the central part of Line M2 of the Warsaw Metro. It is named after the Stadion Narodowy (National Stadium), which is located in the area.

The station fully opened for passenger use on 8 March 2015 as part of the inaugural stretch of Line M2 between Rondo Daszyńskiego and Dworzec Wileński. It was designed by Polish architect Andrzej M. Chołdzyński and constructed by Metroprojekt. Murals were created by Wojciech Fangor, artist of the Polish School of Posters.

The station was constructed under Sokola street parallel to the Warsaw Stadion railway station, which was refurbished at the same time, with a direct interchange between them.

Gallery

References

External links

ZTM Municipal Transport Authority website - Warsaw Metro page

Railway stations in Poland opened in 2015
Line 2 (Warsaw Metro) stations